Leukocyte receptor tyrosine kinase is an enzyme that in humans is encoded by the LTK gene.

Function 

The protein encoded by this gene is a member of the ALK/LTK receptor family of receptor tyrosine kinases (RTKs) whose ligand is unknown. Closely related to the insulin receptor family of RTKs. Tyrosine-specific phosphorylation of proteins is a key to the control of diverse pathways leading to cell growth and differentiation. Two alternatively spliced transcript variants encoding different isoforms have been described for this gene.

Interactions 

LTK has been shown to interact with IRS-1, Shc, and PIK3R1.

References

Further reading 

 
 
 
 
 
 
 
 
 
 
 
 

Tyrosine kinase receptors